Olena Hrachykivna Akopyan (born 4 October 1969) is a Paralympic swimmer from Ukraine competing mainly in category S5 events. She is also one of the rare sportswomen to have competed in both the summer and winter Paralympics having competed in the biathlon and cross-country skiing in the winter Paralympics. The majority of Akopyan's Paralympic success came in the pool where she won thirteen of her fifteen medals including her only gold medal.

Career 
Each time she finishing behind France's Beatrice Hess, who set two world records and a Paralympic record in the three events. Akopyan placed sixth in the 100m breaststroke.

At the 1998 Winter Paralympics in Nagano, Akopyan won a bronze in the  sitski biathlon and the  sitski cross-country.

At the 2000 Summer Paralympics, Akopyan again won silver medals in the 50m, 100m and 200m freestyle including, breaking the Paralympic record in the 50m freestyle first heat only to see Hess break it in the second heat and then set a world record in the final. Akopyan came in fourth in the 50m butterfly and 50m backstroke.

At the 2004 Summer Paralympics, Akopyan won a silver in the 50m butterfly behind Teresa Perales of Spain and another silver in the 200m freestyle behind Hess. She beat Hess to the gold medal in the 50m freestyle. Sheh also picked up a bronze medal in the 200m freestyle, behind both Perales and Hess, and was a member of the Ukrainian 4x50m medley squad that finished fourth. Akopyan was coached by Maryna Kuzmina (Honored coach of Ukraine) from 2001- 2005.

At the 2008 Summer Paralympics, Akopyan broke the World record in the 50m butterfly only to see both China's Fuying Jiang and Russia's Anastasia Diodorova swim quicker in the final leaving her with the bronze medal. She took the bronze medal in the 50m and 200m freestyle and finished fourth in the 100m freestyle.

Personal life 
Akopyan was disabled as a teenager as a result of a knife attack in Belgorod, where she had moved to attend a music school. She was married in August 2008. In 2010, she gave birth to a son and daughter.

References

External links
 

1969 births
Living people
Paralympic biathletes of Ukraine
Paralympic cross-country skiers of Ukraine
Paralympic swimmers of Ukraine
Swimmers at the 1996 Summer Paralympics
Swimmers at the 2000 Summer Paralympics
Swimmers at the 2004 Summer Paralympics
Swimmers at the 2008 Summer Paralympics
Paralympic gold medalists for Ukraine
Paralympic silver medalists for Ukraine
Paralympic bronze medalists for Ukraine
Ukrainian female biathletes
Ukrainian female cross-country skiers
Ukrainian female butterfly swimmers
Ukrainian female freestyle swimmers
People from Yenakiieve
Medalists at the 1998 Winter Paralympics
Medalists at the 1996 Summer Paralympics
Medalists at the 2000 Summer Paralympics
Medalists at the 2004 Summer Paralympics
Medalists at the 2008 Summer Paralympics
Ukrainian people of Armenian descent
Paralympic medalists in swimming
Paralympic medalists in biathlon
Paralympic medalists in cross-country skiing
S5-classified Paralympic swimmers
Sportspeople from Donetsk Oblast
20th-century Ukrainian women
21st-century Ukrainian women